Dak Bungalow or Bangalow may refer to any of the many dak bungalows erected during the 19th century by the British Raj.

It may refer more specifically to:

 Dak Bungalow, a stop on the Patna Metro in India
 Ari Bangla, a landmark in Aritar, Sikkim, India
 Quaid-e-Azam tourist lodge, Barsala, Pakistan
 Dak Bungalow Road, thoroughfares in several Indian, Bangladeshi, and Pakistani cities

See also
 Daftarkhana, also known as Old Dak Bungalow, a landmark in Fatehpur Sikri near Agra in India